Papa is a nickname which may refer to:

 Cool Papa Bell (1903–1991), African-American Negro league baseball player, member of the Baseball Hall of Fame
 Papa Bue (1930–2011), Danish jazz trombonist and bandleader
 Papa Joe Chevalier (1948–2011), American sports radio personality
 Papa John Creach (1917–1994), American violinist
 Papa Dee (born 1966), Swedish raga musician 
 Papa Bouba Diop (1978−2020), Senegalese footballer
 Louis Faury (1874–1947), French general 
 Michele Greco (1924–2008), Sicilian Mafia member nicknamed "il Papa" ("the Pope")
 Paul Hausser (1880–1972), German World War II Waffen SS officer
 Papa Haydn (1732–1809), Austrian composer Joseph Haydn
 Ernest Hemingway (1899–1961), American author and journalist
 Walter Hörnlein (1893–1961), German World War II general
 Papa Jackson (born 1982), Filipino disc jockey 
 Joseph Joffre (1852–1931), French World War I general 
 Papa Jack Laine (1873–1966), American jazz drummer and bandleader
 Papa Charlie McCoy (1909–1950), African-American delta blues musician and songwriter
 Sokratis Papastathopoulos (born 1988), Greek footballer
 John Phillips (musician) (1935–2001), American singer-songwriter and guitarist 
 Papa Don Schroeder (1940–2019), American music executive
 Scott Steiner (born 1962), American professional wrestler nicknamed "Big Poppa Pump"
 Friedrich Graf von Wrangel (1784–1877), Prussian Army field marshal

See also 
 Dad (nickname)
 Daddy (nickname)
 Pappy
 Pop (nickname)
 Poppa (disambiguation)
 Pops (nickname)

Lists of people by nickname